Wellington Silva may refer to:

 Wellington Silva (footballer, born 1987), Brazilian football forward
 Wellington Silva (footballer, born 1988), Brazilian football right-back
 Wellington Silva (footballer, born 1993), Brazilian football winger

See also
Wellington (footballer, born 1987), full name Wellington Carlos da Silva, Brazilian football striker